"Proteoarchaeota" are a proposed archaeal kingdom thought to be closely related to the Eukaryotes.

Classification 
The phylogenetic relationship of this group is still under discussion. The relationship of the members is approximately as follows:

Notes

References

Archaea
Kingdoms (biology)